Stopanska banka (full legal name: Stopanska banka AD Skopje) is a bank founded in 1944 with headquarters in Skopje, Republic of North Macedonia. Currently it is the largest bank in the Republic of North Macedonia by equity and branch network.

As of December 31, 2015, it operated a network of 64 branches.

History 

The bank was established in 1944 as "Stopanska Banka" by a Decision of the Second Special Meeting of the Anti-fascist Assembly for the National Liberation of Macedonia on 29 December of that year under the name of Makedonska Stopanska Banka.

See also 
Greek investments in North Macedonia

Notes

External links
 Official site

Banks of North Macedonia
Banks established in 1944
Companies based in Skopje